In mathematics, a monotonic function (or monotone function) is a function between ordered sets that preserves or reverses the given order. This concept first arose in calculus, and was later generalized to the more abstract setting of order theory.

In calculus and analysis 
In calculus, a function  defined on a subset of the real numbers with real values is called monotonic if and only if it is either entirely non-increasing, or entirely non-decreasing. That is, as per Fig. 1, a function that increases monotonically does not exclusively have to increase, it simply must not decrease.

A function is called monotonically increasing (also increasing or non-decreasing) if for all  and  such that  one has  , so  preserves the order (see Figure 1). Likewise, a function is called monotonically decreasing (also decreasing or non-increasing) if, whenever , then , so it reverses the order (see Figure 2).

If the order  in the definition of monotonicity is replaced by the strict order , one obtains a stronger requirement. A function with this property is called strictly increasing (also increasing). Again, by inverting the order symbol, one finds a corresponding concept called strictly decreasing (also decreasing). A function with either property is called strictly monotone.

To avoid ambiguity, the terms weakly monotone, weakly increasing and weakly decreasing are often used to refer to non-strict monotonicity.

The terms "non-decreasing" and "non-increasing" should not be confused with the (much weaker) negative qualifications "not decreasing" and "not increasing". For example, the non-monotonic function shown in figure 3 first falls, then rises, then falls again. It is therefore not decreasing and not increasing, but it is neither non-decreasing nor non-increasing.

Inverse of function 

All strictly monotonic functions are invertible because they are guaranteed to have a one-to-one mapping from their range to their domain.

However, functions that are only weakly monotone are not invertible because they are constant on some interval (and therefore are not one-to-one).

A function may be strictly monotonic over a limited a range of values and thus have an inverse on that range even though it is not strictly monotonic everywhere. For example, if  is strictly increasing on the range , then it has an inverse  on the range .

Note that the term monotonic is sometimes used in place of strictly monotonic, so a source may state that all monotonic functions are invertible when they really mean that all strictly monotonic functions are invertible.

Monotonic transformation 

The term monotonic transformation (or monotone transformation) may also cause confusion because it refers to a transformation by a strictly increasing function. This is the case in economics with respect to the ordinal properties of a utility function being preserved across a monotonic transform (see also monotone preferences). In this context, the term "monotonic transformation" refers to a positive monotonic transformation and is intended to distinguish it from a "negative monotonic transformation," which reverses the order of the numbers.

Some basic applications and results 

The following properties are true for a monotonic function :
 has limits from the right and from the left at every point of its domain;
 can only have jump discontinuities;
 can only have countably many discontinuities in its domain. The discontinuities, however, do not necessarily consist of isolated points and may even be dense in an interval (a, b). For example, for any summable sequence  of positive numbers and any enumeration  of the rational numbers, the monotonically increasing function  is continuous exactly at every irrational number (cf. picture).

These properties are the reason why monotonic functions are useful in technical work in analysis. Other important properties of these functions include:
In addition, this result cannot be improved to countable: see Cantor function.
if this set is countable, then  is absolutely continuous
if  is a monotonic function defined on an interval , then  is Riemann integrable.

An important application of monotonic functions is in probability theory. If  is a random variable, its cumulative distribution function  is a monotonically increasing function.

A function is unimodal if it is monotonically increasing up to some point (the mode) and then monotonically decreasing.

In contrast, each constant function is monotonic, but not injective, and hence cannot have an inverse.

In topology

A map  is said to be monotone if each of its fibers is connected; that is, for each element  the (possibly empty) set  is a connected subspace of

In functional analysis 

In functional analysis on a topological vector space , a (possibly non-linear) operator  is said to be a monotone operator if

Kachurovskii's theorem shows that convex functions on Banach spaces have monotonic operators as their derivatives.

 is said to be maximal monotone if it is maximal among all monotone sets in the sense of set inclusion.  The graph of a monotone operator  is a monotone set. A monotone operator is said to be maximal monotone if its graph is a maximal monotone set.

In order theory 

Order theory deals with arbitrary partially ordered sets and preordered sets as a generalization of real numbers. The above definition of monotonicity is relevant in these cases as well. However, the terms "increasing" and "decreasing" are avoided, since their conventional pictorial representation does not apply to orders that are not total.

The composite of two monotone mappings is also monotone.

The dual notion is often called antitone, anti-monotone, or order-reversing. Hence, an antitone function  satisfies the property

Monotone functions are central in order theory. They appear in most articles on the subject and examples from special applications are found in these places. Some notable special monotone functions are order embeddings (functions for which  if and only if  and order isomorphisms (surjective order embeddings).

In the context of search algorithms 
In the context of search algorithms monotonicity (also called consistency) is a condition applied to heuristic functions.

Because every monotonic heuristic is also admissible, monotonicity is a stricter requirement than admissibility. Some heuristic algorithms such as A* can be proven optimal provided that the heuristic they use is monotonic.

In Boolean functions 

In other words, a Boolean function is monotonic if, for every combination of inputs, switching one of the inputs from false to true can only cause the output to switch from false to true and not from true to false. Graphically, this means that an -ary Boolean function is monotonic when its representation as an -cube labelled with truth values has no upward edge from true to false.

The monotonic Boolean functions are precisely those that can be defined by an expression combining the inputs (which may appear more than once) using only the operators and and or (in particular not is forbidden).

See also 
 Monotone cubic interpolation
 Pseudo-monotone operator
 Spearman's rank correlation coefficient - measure of monotonicity in a set of data
 Total monotonicity
 Cyclical monotonicity
 Operator monotone function
 Monotone set function

Notes

Bibliography 

 

 (Definition 9.31)

External links

 
 Convergence of a Monotonic Sequence by Anik Debnath and Thomas Roxlo (The Harker School), Wolfram Demonstrations Project.
 

Functional analysis
Order theory
Real analysis
Types of functions